Kakang Rudianto (born 2 February 2003) is an Indonesian professional footballer who plays as a defender for Liga 1 club Persib Bandung and the Indonesia national under-20 team.

Club career

Persib Bandung
He was signed for Persib Bandung to play in Liga 1 in the 2021 season. Kakang made his first-team debut on 29 January 2022 in a match against Persikabo 1973 at the Ngurah Rai Stadium, Denpasar. He also scored his first goal for the team in 22nd minute.

International career
On 30 May 2022, Kakang made his debut for an Indonesian youth team against a Venezuela U-20 squad in the 2022 Maurice Revello Tournament in France. In October 2022, it was reported that Kakang received a call-up from the Indonesia U-20 for a training camp, in Turkey and Spain.

Career statistics

Club

Notes

Honours

Individual
 Persib Bandung Breakthrough Player of the Year 2021–22'''

References

External links
 Kakang Rudianto at Soccerway
 Kakang Rudianto at Liga Indonesia

2003 births
Living people
Indonesian footballers
People from Cianjur
Sportspeople from West Java
Liga 1 (Indonesia) players
Persib Bandung players
Bandung United F.C. players
Association football defenders
Indonesia youth international footballers